Michael Goldbloom  (born 1953) is a Canadian lawyer, publisher, and academic administrator. He is the former publisher of the Toronto Star, Canada's largest newspaper by circulation.

Early life and education 
Born in Montreal, Quebec, as the son of Victor Goldbloom, he attended Selwyn House School and Williston Academy before receiving a Bachelor of Arts degree in 1974 from Harvard University. He received a Bachelor of Civil Law degree in 1978 and a Bachelor of Law degree in 1979 from McGill University. He was called to the Quebec Bar in 1981.

Career 
Goldbloom was an editorial writer for The Montreal Gazette in 1980. From 1981 to 1991, he was a labour lawyer at the Martineau Walker law firm (now known as Fasken). From 1985 to 1987, he was the president of Alliance Quebec. From 1991 to 1994, he was the president and CEO of the YMCA de Montréal. In 1994, he was appointed president and publisher of The Montreal Gazette.

In 2003, he was appointed deputy publisher and senior vice-president of strategy and human resources at the Toronto Star. In 2004, he was named publisher. He was replaced in 2006 and later was appointed head of McGill University's government relations and inter-institutional affairs office, effective January 3, 2007.

Goldbloom became the 18th Principal and Vice-Chancellor of Bishop's University in Lennoxville, Quebec in August 2008.

In 2013, he was made a Member of the Order of Canada "for establishing several transformative civic organizations in Montreal and for his dedication to building bridges between the city’s English- and French-speaking communities".

Goldbloom was appointed as the Chair of the CBC/Radio-Canada Board of Directors on April 3, 2018, for a five-year term.

References

External links
 McGill News interview
 The Canadian Jewish News article on Goldbloom

1953 births
Anglophone Quebec people
Canadian newspaper executives
Harvard University alumni
Lawyers from Montreal
Living people
Members of the Order of Canada
Toronto Star publishers (people)
Williston Northampton School alumni
Writers from Montreal
Labour lawyers
McGill University Faculty of Law alumni
YMCA leaders
Jewish Canadian journalists